Prostki  is a village in Ełk County, Warmian-Masurian Voivodeship, in northern Poland. It is the seat of the gmina (administrative district) called Gmina Prostki. It is located in the historic region of Masuria.

In 2006 the village had a population of 3,000.

History
In 1656 the Battle of Prostki was fought nearby, during which Polish forces commanded by Wincenty Korwin Gosiewski defeated the combined Swedish-Brandenburgian forces.

In the late 19th century, the village had an almost exclusively Polish population of 1,300. The populace was mostly employed in agriculture, while 150 people worked in reloading trains.

Under Nazi Germany, two labour camps of the Reich Labour Service were operated in the village.

Sports
The local football club is Pojezierze Prostki. It competes in the lower leagues.

Notable residents
Ernst Meyer (1887–1930), German politician
Michał Słoma, Polish rower

References

Villages in Ełk County